Busy Bees Day Nurseries  is the UK's largest nursery group, with over 375 nurseries across England, Scotland and Wales.

Busy Bees was founded in 1983 and subsequently acquired nursery chains including, Bush Babies, Leapfrog, Kids 1st, Just Learning, Kindercare, Tibbitots  and Caring Day Care.

The Ontario Teachers’ Pension Plan  acquired Busy Bees Nursery Group in October 2013, with Busy Bees management maintaining a significant minority share in the company. Busy Bees completed its first international acquisition  in South East Asia with the purchase of 48 nurseries and Asia International College in Singapore along with a further 12 nurseries in Malaysia, the number of nurseries has now increased further to 52 in Singapore. Busy Bees also founded a childcare voucher company in 1998, which they later sold in 2008.

The Busy Bees Nurseries in the UK is supported by learning programmes in line with the Early Years Foundation Stage Statutory Framework.  
 
In 2015 two of the founders of Busy Bees Nurseries were awarded an OBE for their longstanding service to the childcare sector.

References

Child care companies
British companies established in 1983
Education companies established in 1983
Education companies of the United Kingdom